The 2011 Redcar and Cleveland Borough Council election took place on 5 May 2011 to elect members of Redcar and Cleveland Unitary Council in England. The whole council was up for election and the Labour party gained overall control of the council from no overall control.

Background

Election Result

Ward Results

In the 2011 local elections, the following members were returned:

References

2011 English local elections
2011
2010s in North Yorkshire